Raúl Molina may refer to:
Raúl Molina Martínez (born 1938), Salvadoran politician
Raúl De Molina (born 1959), Cuban TV-show host
Raúl Molina Alcocer (born 1976), Spanish footballer
Raul Molina (musician), musician in the group C-Note